Dehuiyeh (also Romanized as Dehū’īyeh, Dehoo’yeh, Deh’ūyeh, and Dohū’īyeh) is a village in Sarcheshmeh Rural District, in the Central District of Rafsanjan County, Kerman Province, Iran. At the 2006 census, its population was 48, in 12 families.

References 

Populated places in Rafsanjan County